John Twining may refer to:
 John Thomas Twining, protestant minister in Nova Scotia
 John Aldred Twining, British tea merchant